The 2017 Georgia Southern Eagles football team represented Georgia Southern University in the 2017 NCAA Division I FBS football season. The Eagles played their home games at Paulson Stadium in Statesboro, Georgia, and competed in the Sun Belt Conference. They were led by coach Chad Lunsford following the mid-season firing of second-year head coach Tyson Summers. They finished the season 2–10, 2–6 in Sun Belt play to finish in a tie for tenth place.

Following the season, interim head coach Chad Lunsford was promoted to head coach.

Previous season 
The Eagles finished the 2016 season 5–7, 4–4 in Sun Belt play to finish in sixth place.

Schedule
Georgia Southern announced its 2017 football schedule on March 1, 2017. The 2016 schedule consisted of five home and seven away games in the regular season. The Eagles hosted Sun Belt opponents Arkansas State, New Mexico State, Georgia State, and South Alabama, and traveled to Troy, Appalachian State, Louisiana-Lafayette, and Coastal Carolina.

The team played four non–conference games, one home game against New Hampshire from the Colonial Athletic Association (CAA), and traveled to three road games against Auburn from the Southeastern Conference (SEC), Indiana from the Big Ten Conference (B1G) and UMass (Independent). Due to the then-impending impact of Hurricane Irma on southern Georgia, the home game against New Hampshire was relocated to Legion Field in Birmingham, Alabama.

Game summaries

at Auburn

New Hampshire

at Indiana

Arkansas State

New Mexico State

at UMass

Tyson Summers was fired as head coach the day after the game. Assistant Head Coach Chad Lunsford was named Interim Coach for the remainder of the season.

at Troy

Georgia State

at Appalachian State

South Alabama

at Louisiana–Lafayette

at Coastal Carolina

References

Georgia Southern
Georgia Southern Eagles football seasons
Georgia Southern Eagles football